A Green Story is a 2012 film written and directed by Nika Agiashvili.

Plot
An American businessman is diagnosed with cancer and given a few months to live. He reflects on his early life as a Greek immigrant in the 1950s and decides to close one last business deal that will immortalize his company's success.

References

External links

2012 films
2010s Greek-language films
English-language Greek films
2010s English-language films
2012 multilingual films